Anolis bremeri, also known commonly as the Cuban variegated anole and the Herradura anole, is a species of lizard in the family Dactyloidae. The species is endemic to Cuba. Two subspecies are recognized.

Etymology
The specific name, bremeri, is in honor of John Lewis Bremer (1874–1959), who was an American physician and anatomy professor.

Description
A. bremeri is moderate-sized for its genus. Males are larger than females.

Reproduction
A. bremeri is oviparous.

Subspecies
Two subspecies are recognized as being valid, including the nominotypical subspecies.
Anolis bremeri bremeri  – Pinar del Río Province, Cuba
Anolis bremeri insulaepinorum  – Isla de la Juventud (formerly called the Isle of Pines), Cuba

References

Further reading
Barbour T (1914). "A Contribution to the Zoögeography of the West Indies, with Especial Reference to Amphibians and Reptiles". Memoirs of the Museum of Comparative Zoölogy at Harvard College 44 (2): 205–359 + one unnumbered plate. (Anolis bremeri, new species, p. 288–289).
Garrido OH (1972). "Anolis bremeri Barbour (Lacertilia: Iguanidae) en el occidente de Cuba e Isla de Piños ". Caribbean Journal of Science 12 (1–2): 59–77. (Anolis bremeri insulaepinorum, new subspecies, p. 63). (in Spanish).
Schwartz A, Henderson RW (1991). Amphibians and Reptiles of the West Indies: Descriptions, Distributions, and Natural History. Gainesville, Florida: University of Florida Press. 720 pp. . (Anolis bremeri, p. 230).
Schwartz A, Thomas R (1975). A Check-list of West Indian Amphibians and Reptiles. Carnegie Museum of Natural History Special Publication No. 1. Pittsburgh, Pennsylvania: Carnegie Museum of Natural History. 216 pp. (Anolis bremeri, p. 71).

Anoles
Reptiles of Cuba
Endemic fauna of Cuba
Reptiles described in 1914
Taxa named by Thomas Barbour